Jan Verschuren  (born 1962 in  Asten, Netherlands) is a Dutch organist.

Biography
Jan Verschuren studied to become an engineer at the Eindhoven University of Technology and at the same time he practiced the organ with Hub. Houët in Eindhoven, the Netherlands. He continued practicing the organ under the instruction of Reitze Smits at the Lemmensinstituut in Leuven, Belgium and completed it with a Premier Prix/first prize. Further more Verschuren continued under the instruction of Reitze Smits for the degree of Master of Music at the Conservatoire of Utrecht, the Netherlands.

Additionally he took advanced interpretation courses with Jan-Willem Jansen at the Conservatoire of Toulouse and with Michel Bouvard at the Conservatoire of Paris.

Jan Verschuren was appointed organist in Mill and Boxmeer, the Netherlands.
In 1998 he has been appointed as university organist of the University Leiden, the Netherlands.
In 2001 Jan Verschuren succeeded Folkert Grondsma as titular-organist of the Hartebrug Church in Leiden.
Moreover in 2006 Jan Verschuren has been appointed as university-organist of the Eindhoven University of Technology in Eindhoven.

Organ-recitals took him to many organs in the Netherlands, Austria, Belgium, Germany, France, Hungary, Italy, the Czech Republic and Poland.
Moreover, Jan Verschuren has made CD-recordings and performed on the Dutch radio.

At the end of 2002 as university-organist Jan erschuren was invited to perform the world première of "Le loup en pierre" by Clarence Barlow an organ piece for two organs in the Peter-Church in Leiden.

Awards
In April 2002 Jan Verschuren was awarded the medaille d’argent/silver medal of the Société Académique des Arts-Sciences-Lettres de Paris in appreciation of propagating French organ music.

References
Dutch papers 1985-2009.
University of Leiden.
Hartebrug-church Leiden.
Booklet (in Dutch) Organday in Leiden June 2000 – 2008.
Booklet (in Dutch) Smits-organday in the county of Ravenstein and the county of Cuijk May 2000.
Booklet Euregio-concerts in province of Limburg and Germany 2006, 2007, 2008.
 Aachener Newspaper August 2008
Entry to the Dutch Wikipedia Jan Verschuren.
Dies Natalis 2009 University of Leiden.

External links
  Homepage

1962 births
Living people
Conservatoire de Paris alumni
Dutch classical organists
Male classical organists
People from Asten, Netherlands
21st-century organists
21st-century male musicians